Chrysochlorina is a genus of flies in the family Stratiomyidae.

Species
Chrysochlorina albipes James, 1939
Chrysochlorina bezziana Iide, 1966
Chrysochlorina breviseta (Walker, 1854)
Chrysochlorina castanea (Macquart, 1838)
Chrysochlorina costalimai Iide, 1966
Chrysochlorina currani Iide, 1966
Chrysochlorina echemon (Walker, 1849)
Chrysochlorina elegans (Perty, 1833)
Chrysochlorina fasciata (Thomson, 1869)
Chrysochlorina femoralis (Curran, 1929)
Chrysochlorina flavescens (James, 1937)
Chrysochlorina frosti James, 1939
Chrysochlorina haterius (Walker, 1849)
Chrysochlorina incompleta (Curran, 1929)
Chrysochlorina longiseta (Walker, 1854)
Chrysochlorina maculiventris (Rondani, 1850)
Chrysochlorina pluricolor (Bigot, 1879)
Chrysochlorina pulchra (Williston, 1900)
Chrysochlorina quadrilineata (Bigot, 1887)
Chrysochlorina similis (Macquart, 1855)
Chrysochlorina varia (Curran, 1929)
Chrysochlorina vespertilio (Fabricius, 1805)

References

Stratiomyidae
Brachycera genera
Diptera of North America
Diptera of South America